Lola Castegnaro (16 May 1900 – September 1979) was a Costa Rican conductor, composer and music educator. She was born in San José, Costa Rica, and studied music with her father, Italian-born composer Alvise Castegnaro. She continued her studies at the Verdi Conservatory in Milan and the Academia Filarmonica in Bologna. After completing her studies, she returned to Costa Rica in 1941 where she arranged for radio broadcasts of her work and conducted opera. She later moved to Mexico and took a teaching position at the Academia de Canto de Fanny Anitùa. She died in Mexico City.

Works
Castegnaro was noted for songs. Selected works include:
Mirka, operetta
Sueño de amor
La casita
Panis angelicus
Ojos perversos
Lasciate amare

References

1900 births
1979 deaths
20th-century classical composers
Music educators
Women classical composers
Costa Rican composers
Costa Rican conductors (music)
People from San José, Costa Rica
Milan Conservatory alumni
Costa Rican people of Italian descent
Costa Rican emigrants to Mexico
20th-century conductors (music)
Women music educators
20th-century women composers